David Terrell (born March 13, 1979) is a former American football wide receiver. After playing college football at the University of Michigan, he was selected as the eighth pick in the first round of the 2001 NFL Draft by the Chicago Bears of the National Football League (NFL). He played five seasons, during which he caught nine touchdown passes.

High school career
David Terrell attended Huguenot High School in Richmond, Virginia and was a two  sport star in High school football and basketball. David Terrell was SELECTED USA TODAY 1ST TEAM UTILTY PLAYER OF THE YEAR.

College career
A three-year letterman and two-year starter at wide receiver for the University of Michigan, David Terrell played in 37 games and made 21 starts before declaring for the NFL draft as junior. A two-time All-Big Ten Conference selection, Terrell was named to the 2000 College Football News and CNN/Sports Illustrated All-America first-team squads. He became the first player in Michigan history to have multiple 1000-yard receiving seasons (1,130 yards in 2000 and 1,038 in 1999). Terrell finished his career with a school record 1,130 receiving yards on 67 receptions and scored 14 touchdowns in 2000. He capped an outstanding sophomore campaign by being named the FedEx Orange Bowl MVP after setting career highs with 10 receptions for 150 yards and three tds. He caught 71 passes for 1038 yards and scored seven touchdowns as a sophomore. A native of Richmond, VA, Terrell was the eighth overall pick of the 2001 NFL Draft by the Chicago Bears.

As a freshman and sophomore, Terrell also saw time at defensive back as a two-way player.  He ultimately appeared in 6 games on defense with 8 tackles, 2 pass break ups, and an interception.

Professional career
Terrell was drafted by the Chicago Bears with the eighth overall pick in the 2001 NFL Draft. He was later cut by the Bears, and he attempted to come back with both the New England Patriots and Denver Broncos. After signing a one-year contract with the Denver Broncos on April 12, 2007, Terrell was cut by the team on August 27, 2007.  In August 2009, Terrell tried out for the Kansas City Chiefs, but Amani Toomer was signed instead. On August 19, 2013, he was arrested and charged with a felony for distribution of marijuana and misdemeanor battery. On February 16, 2014, Terrell was acquitted on all charges.

NFL statistics

References

External links

1979 births
African-American players of American football
American football wide receivers
Chicago Bears players
Denver Broncos players
Living people
Michigan Wolverines football players
New England Patriots players
Players of American football from Richmond, Virginia
21st-century African-American sportspeople
20th-century African-American sportspeople

ja:デビッド・テレル